Nate Jones may refer to:

 Nate Jones (boxer) (born 1972), American former boxer
 Nate Jones (cornerback) (born 1982), American former gridiron football cornerback, later a football official
 Nate Jones (wide receiver) (born 1985), American former gridiron football wide receiver
 Nate Jones (baseball) (born 1986), American baseball pitcher
 Nate Jones On Bass, American bassist, songwriter, and producer

See also
 Nathan Jones (disambiguation)
 Nathaniel Jones (disambiguation)